Guth na Bliadhna ("Voice of the Year") was a Scottish Gaelic and English-language magazine published between 1904 and 1925 in Glasgow. It was known for its focus on politics, particularly issues radical at the time such as Scottish independence and even the political union of Ireland, Scotland, and other Celtic-language speaking areas. The magazine was established by a Roman Catholic, Ruaraidh Arascain is Mhàirr, a Lowland Scottish aristocrat who had learned Gaelic from a nurse. The next long-running Gaelic periodical would be Gairm, first published in 1952. Patrick Pearse once contributed to the publication.

References

External links
 Guth na Bliadhna, vol. 1-4 available at the website of Sabhal Mòr Ostaig
 Guth na Bliadhna, Winter 1908 at archive.org

Defunct political magazines published in the United Kingdom
Magazines established in 1904
Magazines disestablished in 1925
Scottish Gaelic magazines
Mass media in Glasgow
Political magazines published in Scotland
1904 establishments in Scotland
1925 disestablishments in Scotland